Ułan Księcia Józefa is a Polish historical film. It was released on December 29, 1937.

References

External links
 

1937 films
Polish historical films
1930s Polish-language films
Polish black-and-white films
1930s historical films